Ilya Kornilovich Smirnov (30 July 1887 – 28 June 1964) was a Soviet army general. He fought in the Imperial Russian Army during World War I before going over to the Bolsheviks during the subsequent Civil War. He was a recipient of the Order of Lenin, the Order of the Red Banner and the Order of Kutuzov. He retired in 1953 at the age of 66.

References

 
 

1887 births
1964 deaths
People from Kostroma Oblast
People from Kologrivsky Uyezd
First convocation members of the Soviet of the Union
Second convocation members of the Soviet of the Union
Soviet lieutenant generals
Frunze Military Academy alumni
Russian military personnel of World War I
Soviet military personnel of the Russian Civil War
Soviet military personnel of World War II
Recipients of the Order of Lenin
Recipients of the Order of the Red Banner
Recipients of the Order of Kutuzov, 1st class